Breaston is a civil parish in the Erewash district of Derbyshire, England.  The parish contains six listed buildings that are recorded in the National Heritage List for England.  Of these, one is listed at Grade I, the highest of the three grades, and the others are at Grade II, the lowest grade.  The parish contains the village of Breaston, and the listed buildings consist of houses, a former farm building, and a church.


Key

Buildings

References

Citations

Sources

 

Lists of listed buildings in Derbyshire